The  is a river in northeast Chiba Prefecture, Japan. Under the Rivers Act of 1906 the Kuriyama is designated as a Class 2 River. The Kuriyama is known as the southernmost river in Japan with a salmon run. The  is located at the mouth of the river in Yokoshibahikari.

Origin of name
By tradition, in the 7th century the former town of Kurihara, now part of Katori, saw an influx of immigrants from the Korean Peninsula. The area around the river was called , a name and kanji character usage of likely origin from the Korean language. The river was later written with its current combination of two kanji characters. The first,  means "chestnut", and the second, means "mountain".

Geography

The source of the Kuriyama River is on the central Shimōsa Plateau in Narita or Sawara, Katori. Kurimoto, a former village in Katori, means "source of the Kuri." This area of northern Chiba Prefecture originally consisted of grassland and marshes, and was developed for agricultural use over time. The Kuriyama is connected to the Tone River by the  Ryōsō Canal, completed in 1967, which provides water for paddy irrigation. The drainage area of the Kuriyama crosses eight towns and cities across a wide part of northeastern Chiba Prefecture. They include Narita, Katori, Sōsa, Asahi, Tako, Shibayama, Sanmu, and Yokoshibahikari. The Kuriyama crosses the Kujūkuri Plain and pours into the Pacific Ocean at the midpoint of Kujūkuri Beach in Yokoshibahikari.

Tributaries

Salmon
The Kuriyama River is the southernmost river in Japan with a salmon run, and the salmon play an important part in the history and local culture of the Kuriyama River region. The rapid increase of population and industrial development on the tributaries of the Kuriyama have seriously reduced the number of salmon in the river. The association carries out capture and research operations from mid-October to late December at the Yokoshiba Dam in Yokoshibahikari during the salmon run. Researchers extract eggs from the salmon and carry out fertilization of the population. The association also carries out artificial fertilization and fry discharge projects. Residents in the Kuriyama River area interested in the repopulation of the salmon cooperate in the hatching, care and distribution of salmon hatchlings from late January until their release along the river in early March. The first fry discharge was carried out in 1977, and the first successful salmon run from the fry discharge was in 1980.

History
The Kuriyama River area has been settled from very early in Japanese history. Excavation of the Iizuka Historic Remains Site, the Kashiwakuma Kofun Group, and the Ogawadai Kofun Group, located along the upper reaches of the Kuriyama and its tributaries, attest to the prosperity of northern Chiba Prefecture in the Kofun period (250 – 538). Excavation of kofun tumuli and other sites along the Kuriyama has revealed a wide variety of haniwa clay funerary objects, swords, horse bridles, and other implements of daily use typical of the period. The Kuriyama was later developed into shōen estates used for the production of rice. The upper areas of the river were part of the Katori ranch land, and the Takaya tributary of the Kuriyama was noted for its population of feral horses. The Yamakura Shrine and Yamakura Kanpuku-ji, both likely built in the early 9th century, have long held religious ceremonies associated with the Kuriyama River salmon. Kanpuku-ji was part of the Yamakura Shrine complex until their division shortly after the Meiji Restoration. In 1871, under the shinbutsu bunri separation of Buddhist temples and shrines, the shrine and temple were separated, but both continue to carry out ceremonies related to the salmon. The festival historically occurred in November with the coming of the salmon up the Kuriyama.

Use
The entirety of the Kuriyama River provides irrigation to paddy fields. Areas along the river were historically rich in rice production, and remain so today. Farms along the Kuriyama have diversified from rice and other grain production to vegetable farming, notably of sweet potatoes. The Edo period ranches no longer exist on the upper reaches of the Kuriyama, but pig farming is still carried out along the upper reaches of the river in Katori.

Recreation
The Kuriyama River is a popular fishing spot. Carp, Carassius, the Crucian carp and flathead mullet are all found in great quantity. The fishing of salmon, formerly widespread along the Kuriyama, is now limited due to the decrease of the salmon population. Cities and towns along the river now consider the Kuriyama a precious commodity, and fishing events are held in relation to the salmon catch in each town and city.

2011 Tōhoku earthquake and tsunami
The Kuriyama River was inundated by a tsunami caused by the 2011 Tōhoku earthquake and tsunami on March 3, 2011. The tsunami traveled up the river. Flooding from the tsunami, while insignificant compared to other regions of Japan, damaged river embankments, homes and the Yamakuragawa Fishing Port across the lower part of the river.

References

External links

栗山川を感じて (In Japanese and English)
Chibabox.com: 栗山川 
Images of damage caused by the tsunami accompanying the 2011 Tōhoku earthquake and tsunami 

Rivers of Chiba Prefecture
Rivers of Japan